The Indian Space Research Organisation has carried out 116 spacecraft missions, 86 launch missions and planned several missions including the Aditya, Gaganyaan and MOM 2.

Missions
These are all of the completed missions.

Lunar

Interplanetary

Astronomy

Planned missions

See also
 List of Indian satellites
 List of foreign satellites launched by India
 List of NASA missions
 List of European Space Agency programmes and missions

References

External links
 ISRO official website

Missions
Lists of space missions
India science and technology-related lists